Orkan Balkan (born 12 March 1987) is a German footballer who plays for FC Anadolu München. He currently plays for Çankırıspor.

References

External links
 
 

1987 births
Living people
Turkish footballers
German people of Turkish descent
SpVgg Unterhaching players
Orduspor footballers
2. Bundesliga players
3. Liga players
Footballers from Munich
Association football midfielders
SpVgg Unterhaching II players